Florea Martinovici (19 April 1940 – 16 June 2011) was a Romanian footballer who played as a winger.

International career
Florea Martinovici was the first Universitatea Craiova player that played for Romania's national team. He scored at his debut in a 7–0 victory against Cyprus at the Euro 1968 qualifiers. He made one more appearance for the national team in a 2–0 victory against Switzerland at the 1970 World Cup qualifiers.

Honours
Jiul Petroșani
Divizia B: 1965–66
Minerul Motru
Divizia C: 1972–73

References

External links

Florea Martinovici at Labtof.ro

1940 births
2011 deaths
Romanian footballers
Romania international footballers
Association football forwards
Liga I players
Liga II players
CSM Jiul Petroșani players
CS Universitatea Craiova players
CS Minerul Motru players
People from Băilești